Egypt is an unincorporated community in Jordan Township, Jasper County, Indiana.

Welsh (formerly Egypt) Cemetery is located in Egypt, Indiana. Some of the first burials in Welsh Cemetery were in 1841, and the name "Egypt Cemetery" was in use until at least 1916.

Geography

References

Unincorporated communities in Jasper County, Indiana
Unincorporated communities in Indiana